Uppalapati Venkata Suryanarayana Prabhas Raju (born 23 October 1979), known mononymously as Prabhas, is an Indian actor who works predominantly in Telugu cinema. One of the highest-paid actors in Indian cinema, Prabhas has featured in Forbes Indias Celebrity 100 list three times since 2015 based on his income and popularity. He has received seven Filmfare Awards South nominations and is a recipient of a Nandi Award and a SIIMA Award.

Prabhas made his acting debut with the 2002 Telugu drama Eeswar, and later attained his breakthrough with the action romance Varsham (2004). His notable works include Chatrapathi (2005), Bujjigadu (2008), Billa (2009), Darling (2010), Mr. Perfect (2011), and Mirchi (2013). He won the Nandi Award for Best Actor for his performance in the lattermost. In 2015, Prabhas starred in the title role in S. S. Rajamouli's epic action drama Baahubali: The Beginning, which is the fourth-highest-grossing Indian film to date. He later reprised his role in its sequel, Baahubali 2: The Conclusion (2017), which became the first Indian film ever to gross over 1,000 crore (US$155 million) in all languages in just ten days, and is the second-highest-grossing Indian film to date.

In addition to acting in films, Prabhas is also the brand ambassador for the Mahindra TUV300. He is the first Telugu actor to receive a wax sculpture at Madame Tussaud's wax museum.

Early life and education
Prabhas was born in to film producer Uppalapati Surya Narayana Raju and Siva Kumari. The youngest of the three children, he has a brother, Prabodh and a sister, Pragathi. He is the nephew of Telugu actor Krishnam Raju. His family hails from Mogalthur, near Bhimavaram of West Godavari district, Andhra Pradesh. 

Prabhas did his schooling at Don Bosco Matriculation Higher Secondary School, Chennai, and at DNR High School, Bhimavaram. He then completed his intermediate education from Nalanda College, Hyderabad. He was then graduated with a B.Tech. degree from Sri Chaitanya College, Hyderabad. He is also an alumnus of Satyanand Film Institute, Visakhapatnam.

Career

2002–2011: Debut and breakthrough 

Prabhas started his film career with Eeswar (2002). In 2003, he was the lead in Raghavendra.

In 2004, he appeared in Varsham and Adavi Raamudu. He received his first nomination for the Filmfare Award for Best Actor – Telugu for his performance in the former.

In 2005, he appeared in Chakram and in the film Chatrapathi, directed by S. S. Rajamouli, in which he portrays the role of a refugee, exploited by goons. It had a 100-day run in 54 centers. Idlebrain.com stated that he had a unique style and macho charm in his screen presence. Chatrapathi earned him his second nomination for the Filmfare Award for Best Actor – Telugu.

Later, he starred in the dance drama Pournami (2006), the action film Yogi (2007) and the action drama Munna (2007). This was followed by the action-comedy Bujjigadu in 2008. In 2009, his two films were Billa and Ek Niranjan. Indiaglitz called Billa "stylish and visually rich". Ek Niranjan earned him his third nomination for the Filmfare Award for Best Actor – Telugu.

In 2010, he appeared in the romantic comedy Darling which received positive reviews upon release. The Times of India gave a 2.5 star rating explaining "Director Karunakaran extracts good performances from his actors, but can't come up with a refreshing plot. It looks like the director hasn't really come out of his Tholi Prema hangover as he dishes out yet another one-sided love saga but fails to come up with a valid and logical reason to make a GenZ lad to hold back his feelings for his lover until the last moment. However, he compensates it all, by adding loads of fun moments in the film and the screenplay does have its share of some touching moments." 

In 2011, he appeared in another romantic comedy Mr. Perfect. The review site GreatAndhra rated the film with three stars and noted "The film comes across as a clean, family entertainer and the intention of the makers must be appreciated. His performance in the film earned him his fourth nomination for the Filmfare Award for Best Actor – Telugu.

2012–2014: Continued career 
In 2012, Prabhas starred in Rebel, an action film directed by Raghava Lawrence. Sashidhar from The Times of India stated, "The film belongs to hard-core Prabhas fans as the movie is stylish and visually rich but not much in content". Purnima Ranawat from NDTV said, "Rebel serves up fare for the mass audience. The film will be definitely liked by Prabhas' fans. Watch it for the dancing talent of Tamannaah and action skills of Prabhas." Radhika Rajamani from Rediff.com gave the movie 1.5 stars out of five and said, "Working with hardly any storyline, director Raghava Lawrence had made a film that is arduous to watch... Rebel is a movie for the masses and certainly not for the discerning audience." He also rendered voice for a short cameo for the film Denikaina Ready (2012).

In 2013, Prabhas starred in Mirchi. Jeevi of Idlebrain.com gave a rating of 3.25 out of 5, commenting that "First half of Mirchi is decent. Flashback episodes which occupies the lion's share of the second half is good. Climax could have been better. The plus points of the film are Prabhas, music and all-round orientation. On a whole, Mirchi has all the ingredients of a commercial potboiler". Mahesh S Koneru gave his verdict that "At the box office, the film will turn in a good commercial performance", giving the film a score of 3.25/5. Way2movies also gave a rating of 3.25/5, giving the verdict that "Prabhas rocks the show in this decent yet formulaic commercial entertainer". SuperGoodMovies gave the film 3 stars in a scale of 5, reviewing that "Go and Watch Mirchi, It entertains both class and mass. It is a worth watch." His performance in the film earned him his fifth nomination for the Filmfare Award for Best Actor – Telugu. He then made his Hindi cinema debut in 2014 in the item number "Punjabi Mast" from the film Action Jackson.

2015–present: Baahubali and pan-India films 

In 2015, Prabhas appeared as Shivudu/Mahendra Baahubali and Amarendra Baahubali in S.S. Rajamouli's epic action drama Baahubali: The Beginning which is the fourth-highest-grossing Indian film to date. The film started a new film movement named pan-India films. Prabhas reprised his role in its sequel, Baahubali 2: The Conclusion (2017), which became the first Indian film ever to gross over 1,000 crore (US$155 million) in all languages in just ten days, and is the second-highest-grossing Indian film to date. He won the SIIMA Award for Best Actor – Telugu for his performance in The Conclusion. He increased his weight to 105 kg for Baahubali's character. His performance in both film earned him his sixth and seventh nominations for the Filmfare Award for Best Actor – Telugu. 

The success of Baahubali has propelled Prabhas to become a pan-Indian actor, receiving significant following in Telugu, Tamil and Hindi languages. 

In 2019, Prabhas starred alongside Shraddha Kapoor in the Sujeeth-directed action thriller Saaho. Despite receiving unfavourable reviews, the film went on to gross over 433 crore. In 2022, Prabhas starred in the period romance film Radhe Shyam directed by Radha Krishna Kumar which received mixed-to-negative reviews.

Upcoming projects 
, Prabhas has five films under various stages of production. The first of which is the Prashanth Neel-directed action film Salaar. He has completed shooting for Om Raut-dirceted Adipurush, an adaptation of the Hindu epic Ramayana where he plays the role of Lord Rama. He also started filming for Nag Ashwin's untitled sci-fi film, tentatively titled Project K in July 2021, starring alongside Deepika Padukone and Amitabh Bachchan. 

Prabhas also started filming an untitled horror-comedy film directed by Maruthi in December 2022. His 25th film Spirit is set to be directed by Sandeep Reddy Vanga under the production of UV Creations, T-Series and Bhadrakali Pictures. Prabhas is also committed to star in an untitled Mythri Movie Makers production, directed by Siddharth Anand.

Brand endorsements 

Prabhas, who has been signed on by Mahindra & Mahindra as brand ambassador for the new Mahindra TUV300 car, has made his debut in the television commercial arena with their new ad in 2015. He generally does not endorse brands frequently. News 18 reported that he rejected brand endorsements worth  in 2020.

In the media 
Prabhas is often referred as "Darling" or "pan-India star". He was ranked second in Times' Most Desirable Men for the year 2017, and twelfth in 2018. He was then added to the Forever Desirable list of Hyderabad Times in 2019. He was the most searched actor on Google in Karnataka, for the year 2019. He is the only actor from south cinema to feature in the magazine Eastern Eye 2019 listing of the 10 Sexiest Asian Men. He was also featured in the GQ in their listing of the most influential young Indians of 2017. In 2021, he has been named the ‘Most Handsome Asian Male’ in the Fancy Odds annual list.

Pooja Dhar of Pinkvilla cited him as "one of the most humble and down-to-earth Indian actors" in her article. In September 2020, Prabhas adopted 1650 acres of land in Khazipally Reserve Forest, and made additional donations for the development of the eco-park in the name of his late father.

Filmography, awards and nominations

See also 
 List of Indian film actors

References

External links 

 

1979 births
21st-century Indian male actors
Indian male film actors
Living people
Male actors from Andhra Pradesh
People from West Godavari district
Telugu male actors
Nandi Award winners
Male actors in Telugu cinema
Male actors in Hindi cinema
Male actors in Tamil cinema
People from Andhra Pradesh
Indian film actors
Indian actors
Film people from Andhra Pradesh
South Indian International Movie Awards winners
Santosham Film Awards winners